Jesus Christ Vampire Hunter is a 2001 Canadian horror parody film from Odessa Filmworks which deals with Jesus Christ's modern-day struggle to protect the lesbians of Ottawa, Ontario, from vampires with the help of Mexican wrestler El Santo (based on El Santo, Enmascarado de Plata, and played by actor Jeff Moffet, who starred as El Santo in two other Odessa Filmworks productions).

This film earned an honorable mention in the Spirit of Slamdance category at the 2002 Slamdance Film Festival.

Plot summary 
After a spree of vampiric attacks on lesbians, Father Eustace (a Catholic priest) realizes that only Jesus Christ can fight off the vampires. Eustace sends two priests to a beach, where they inform Jesus of the problem. Three vampires, including Maxine Shreck, kill the priests, but Jesus kills two of the vampires by using the lake as holy water. Maxine escapes. Jesus goes to Ottawa, gets a haircut, and buys wood to make stakes.

Thirty atheists jump out of a car and confront Jesus, only to be easily defeated. Jesus teams up with Mary Magnum and infiltrates the hospital, where they discover that Dr. Praetorious is performing skin-transplants to make the vampires immune to sunlight. Maxine and Johnny Golgotha defeat Jesus and Mary in a rooftop-battle. Thus Mary is bitten, becoming a vampire.

Jesus calls upon a Mexican wrestler, El Santo, for help. At a nightclub, they slay dozens of vampires, but El Santo and his assistant are captured. The next day, Johnny, Maxine, and Mary capture Jesus and bring him to a junkyard where his allies are being held. Eustace is there, and he reveals that he is a vampire. A battle breaks out. Jesus simultaneously fights Dr. Praetorious at the hospital. The doctor is fatally wounded, but Jesus heals him.

At the junkyard, Eustace stabs Jesus with a stake. A bright light emerges from the wound, killing Eustace and Johnny. El Santo shields a vampire whom he loves from the light, and Jesus cures her and Mary's vampirism. To his surprise, Mary loves Maxine, so Jesus cures her too. Later, Jesus resumes preaching.

Cast 
 Phil Caracas – Jesus Christ, Vampire Hunter
 Jeff Moffet – El Santo
 Murielle Varhelyi – Maxine Shreck
 Maria Moulton – Mary Magnum
 Tim Devries – Father Eustace
 Ian Driscoll – Johnny Golgotha
 Josh Grace – Dr. Praetorious
 Jay Stone – God (voice)
 Jenny Coutts – Virgin Mary
 Ivan Freud – Narrator

Reception 
Time'''s Richard Corliss panned the film, finding that "the comedy is slack, the song lyrics feeble, the pace torpid". Ken Eisner of Variety took a more neutral view, finding that "the film is too silly to offend". Jason Nolan of The Harrow'' deemed the production "horridly wonderful", although uneven, noting that "[w]ith a film like this, you want it to be bumpy". Film Threat's Eric Campos gave the film a generally positive review.

References

External links 

Odessa Filmworks: Jesus Christ Vampire Hunter
 
 
 

2001 comedy horror films
2001 films
Canadian LGBT-related films
English-language Canadian films
Films set in Ontario
Films shot in Ottawa
Cultural depictions of Jesus
Cultural depictions of El Santo
2000s musical comedy films
Portrayals of Jesus in film
Canadian satirical films
Vampire comedy films
2001 LGBT-related films
LGBT-related horror films
LGBT-related musical films
Canadian musical films
LGBT-related science fiction films
Fictional vampire hunters
Canadian vampire films
2000s action comedy films
Canadian action films
2000s action horror films
Canadian comedy horror films
2000s exploitation films
2001 comedy films
2000s English-language films
Films directed by Lee Demarbre
2000s Canadian films